If Mountains Could Sing is an album by guitarist Terje Rypdal, recorded in 1994 and released on the ECM label.

Reception
The Allmusic review awarded the album 3 stars and 4.5 stars for user rating.

Track listing
All compositions by Terje Rypdal
 "The Return of Per Ulv" - 5:03    
 "It's in the Air" - 4:04    
 "But on the Other Hand" - 5:07    
 "If Mountains Could Sing" - 5:15
 "Private Eye" - 5:47    
 "Foran Peisen" - 4:26
 "Dancing Without Reindeers" - 3:27    
 "One for the Roadrunner" - 5:03   
 "Blue Angel" - 3:05    
 "Genie" - 3:47    
 "Lonesome Guitar" - 2:51

Personnel
Terje Rypdal — electric guitars
Bjørn Kjellemyr — bass
Audun Kleive — drums
Terje Tønnesen — violin 
Lars Anders Tomter — viola
Øystein Birkeland — cello
Christian Eggen — conductor

References

ECM Records albums
Terje Rypdal albums
1995 albums
Albums produced by Manfred Eicher